Tankōbon volume 21 to volume 40 encapsulates chapters 201 to 413. Shogakukan released all twenty volumes between October 17, 1998 and February 18, 2003. Viz Media licensed the series and released volume 21 on January 15, 2008 and volume 40 on October 11, 2011.



Volume list

References

Case Closed volumes (21-40)